Martyn Lee may refer to:

 Martyn Lee (broadcaster) (born 1978), British radio broadcaster
 Martyn Lee (footballer) (born 1980), English former footballer

See also 
 Martin Lee (disambiguation)